Beth Anne Raymer (born in 1976, in Steubenville, Ohio) is an American writer and journalist. Raymer received an MFA from Columbia University. As a Fulbright fellow, she studied offshore gambling operations in Costa Rica, Nicaragua, and Panama.
Beth is the author of Lay the Favorite, a  memoir of her experiences in the sex industry, amateur boxing and sports-betting. Her journalism has been published in The Atlantic, Lapham’s Quarterly, Sports Illustrated, and The New York Times Magazine. She has held writing residencies at the MacDowell Colony. 

In 2012, Raymer was working on her second book.

In 2013, Raymer was working on Fireworks Every Night, a novel for Spiegel and Grau.

Her more recent work includes the screenplay and narration for The Lingerie Party, a 2015 short animated film about hard drug abuse ending in death.

Author
Raymer's Lay the Favorite, published in 2010, has been described as a "Dickensian picaresque that paints an entertaining view of sports gambling and her own unconventional character," and   "a tragicomic biography."

In 2007, Focus Features and Random House Films acquired the rights to produce a movie adaptation of the book. Stephen Frears directed the movie, also called Lay the Favorite, which premiered at the 2012 Sundance Film Festival. Rebecca Hall plays Beth, starring alongside Bruce Willis, Catherine Zeta-Jones and Vince Vaughn.

Life experiences
Beth was born to Jerry Raymer.

Having grown up in West Palm Beach, Florida; Beth received an associate degree from Palm Beach Community College, and worked her way through Florida State University as an "in home stripper" and later managed, and modeled for, adult websites. After being fired from a social work job Raymer moved to Las Vegas at the age of 24 and eventually found work in the world of high-stakes gambling and bookmaking.

References

External links
Book review, NPR Books, June 21, 2010

American memoirists
Columbia University School of the Arts alumni
Living people
Writers from Ohio
1976 births
American women memoirists
People from Steubenville, Ohio
People from West Palm Beach, Florida
21st-century American women